Scotiomyia is a genus of flies in the family Dolichopodidae. It is distributed in Papua New Guinea, Singapore and China.

Species
 Scotiomyia flavicauda Wei & Yang, 2007
 Scotiomyia fusca Meuffels & Grootaert, 1997
 Scotiomyia melanura Meuffels & Grootaert, 1997
 Scotiomyia opercula (Wei, 2006)
 Scotiomyia singaporensis Evenhuis & Grootaert, 2002

References 

Dolichopodidae genera
Sympycninae
Diptera of Australasia
Diptera of Asia